The term Orthodox Christianity in Egypt may refer to:

 Eastern Orthodox Christianity in Egypt, representing communities and institutions of Eastern Orthodox Church, in Egypt
 Oriental Orthodox Christianity in Egypt, representing communities and institutions of Oriental Orthodox Church, in Egypt

See also
 Orthodox Christianity (disambiguation)
 Egypt (disambiguation)